Klotten is a winemaking centre and an Ortsgemeinde – a municipality belonging to a Verbandsgemeinde, a kind of collective municipality – in the Cochem-Zell district in Rhineland-Palatinate, Germany. It belongs to the Verbandsgemeinde of Cochem, whose seat is in the like-named town.

Geography 

The municipality lies on the river Moselle and is surrounded by steep slate slopes. Vineyards in Klotten include Burg Coraidelstein, Brauneberg and Rosenberg.

History 
In 698, Klotten had its first documentary mention. The Polish queen Richeza, Count Palatine Ezzo's daughter and Emperor Otto II's granddaughter, quite probably stayed with her three children between 1040 and 1049 in Klotten, where she had herself built a chapel (Nikolauskirche, or Saint Nicholas’s Church) and a dwelling tower, which was linked by a bridge to the chapel. Upon her death on 21 March 1063, she bequeathed all that she owned to the Brauweiler Benedictine Abbey near Cologne. Her sarcophagus stands today in Cologne Cathedral, to the left below the High Altar, the “Epiphany Shrine”.

Electoral-Trier overlordship ended with the French Revolutionary occupation of the Rhine’s left bank between 1794 and 1796. In 1814 Klotten was assigned to the Kingdom of Prussia at the Congress of Vienna. Since 1946, it has been part of the then newly founded state of Rhineland-Palatinate.

Politics

Municipal council 
The council is made up of 16 council members, who were elected at the municipal election held on 7 June 2009, and the honorary mayor as chairman.

The municipal election held on 7 June 2009 yielded the following results:

Mayor 
Klotten's mayor is Holger Becker.

Coat of arms 
The German blazon reads: Von Silber und Blau gespalten. Vorn in Silber ein roter Torturm mit 3 Zinnen, offenem Tor und 3 (2:1) offenen Fenstern. In Blau ein aus dem Schildfuß wachsender goldener Bischofsstab mit Krümme nach außen, darunter im Schildfuß ein schräglinkes, silbernes Wellenbad.

The municipality's arms might in English heraldic language be described thus: Per pale argent issuant from base a gate tower embattled of three gules with three windows and gate of the field, and azure issuant from base a bishop's staff sinister Or surmounted in base by a bendlet sinister wavy of the first.

The arms were designed by Decku of Sankt Wendel and A. Friderichs of Zell.

Town partnerships 
Klotten fosters partnerships with the following places:
 Berlaimont, Nord, France since 1972

Culture and sightseeing

Buildings 
The following are listed buildings or sites in Rhineland-Palatinate’s Directory of Cultural Monuments:
 Burg Coraidelstein (monumental zone) – castle apparently founded by Count Palatine Herman I (last mentioned in 996), important expansion in 1338, “new structure on the fortifications at Klotten” built in 1545, never destroyed, sold for demolition in 1830; still preserved: essentially Romanesque keep with Gothic casing, castle house with round tower, side building (in the southeast a manor house built in 1543-1547 with remnants of three round towers), villa from 1905, renovated in 1955
 Am Mühlenberg – wayside chapel, 17th century; niche cross, 17th century; basalt wayside cross, from 1683
 Bahnhofstraße – railway station; one-floor quarrystone building, partly timber-frame, early 20th century
 Bahnhofstraße 6 – timber-frame house, partly solid, plastered and slated, half-hipped roof, 16th century
 Bahnhofstraße 9 – timber-frame house, partly solid, balloon frame, 16th century
 Bahnhoftstraße 13 – wayside cross; niche cross, from 1646
 Brauweiler Platz – stone with abbot's staff
 Across the street from Fahrstraße 8 – relief, stone with abbot's staff
 Fahrstraße 8 – Gothic solid building, 16th century, back wall partly timber-frame 
 Hauptstraße 19 – Gothic Revival chapel, 19th century
 Hauptstraße 26 – school; quarrystone building, from 1907
 Hauptstraße 56 – sculpture of Saint Nicholas, 19th century
 Hauptstraße 69 – three-floor timber-frame house, partly solid, from 1588
 Hauptstraße 72 – timber-frame house, partly solid, plastered, about 1600
 Hauptstraße 75 – former Malmedyer Hof, manor of Brauweiler Abbey; three-floor timber-frame house, partly solid, 16th century, spire light from the 19th century
 Hauptstraße 80 – timber-frame house, partly solid, from 1632; hearth heating plate, 18th century
 Hauptstraße 89/91 – quarrystone double house, from 1896
 Hauptstraße 101 – three-floor timber-frame house, from 1545
 Hauptstraße 102/103 – three-floor timber-frame house, partly solid, from 1545; fountain, from 1463 (or 1863 – inscription unclear)
 Hauptstraße 104 – three-floor timber-frame house, partly solid, plastered, half-hipped roof, from 1583, 1585 and 1664
 Hohlstraße 4 – timber-frame house, partly solid or sided, possibly from the 16th or 17th century
 Hohlstraße 20 – Moselle winemaker's house; quarrystone building, 19th century
 Hohlstraße/corner of Schulstraße – handpump, 19th century
 Kernstraße/corner of Hauptstraße – wayside cross, from 1772
 Martinstraße 3 – portal, from 1776
 Mittelstraße – Bildstock; solid, plastered, roughly 2.5 m tall, big niche, about 1800
 Mittelstraße 48 – timber-frame house, plastered, 17th century
 Mittelstraße 52 – Moselle winemaker's house; big quarrystone building, from 1871
 Mittelstraße 57 – three-floor timber-frame house, partly solid, plastered and slated, from 1621
 Mittelstraße 58 – timber-frame house, partly solid, half-hipped roof, 16th or 17th century
 Moselstraße – wayside chapel; grave cross fragment; wayside cross, from 1698
 Moselstraße 6 – quarrystone Moselle winemaker's house, about 1850
 Moselstraße 11 – winemaker's villa; three-floor quarrystone building with half-hipped roof
 Moselstraße 16 – winemaking estate; big quarrystone building, 19th century
 Obere Kirchstraße – wayside cross, from 1809
 Obere Kirchstraße – sandstone wayside cross; 17th/18th century
 Obere Kirchstraße 6 – two-winged timber-frame house; three-floor part, balloon frame, from 1524, two-floor part, 17th century
 Obere Kirchstraße 15 – former rectory; three-floor timber-frame house, partly solid, 17th century; plastered building, partly timber-frame, built onto it, 1901
 Obere Kirchstraße 16 – Alte Post; Late Historicist plastered building, sided, about 1900
 Obere Kirchstraße/corner of Brühlstraße – wayside chapel, 19th century; niche cross, from 1599
 Reuschelstraße 6/7 – two timber-frame houses, partly solid, about 1700, shed; whole complex
 Schulstraße – Saint Maximin's Catholic Parish Church (Pfarrkirche St. Maximin); Romanesque west tower, built higher in 1564, originally twin-naved, south chapel from the 16th century, in 1868 remodelled into an entrance hall while nave was expanded into a three-naved hall church; bronze door boss, 12th century; at the graveyard 42 grave crosses, earliest from 1507; tomb, 19th century; Late Gothic stone cross, earlier half of the 15th century; warriors’ memorial; Crucifixion group, 19th century; whole complex with old graveyard and rectory
 Schulstraße – wayside cross, from 1657
 Schulstraße 3 – former tithing house; quarrystone building, partly timber-frame, 18th century
 Schulstraße 4 – door lintel with engravings, about 1050
 Jewish graveyard – 14 gravestones, oldest from 1878
 Chapel with Way of the Cross – aisleless church with timber-frame porch; two crosses, from 1637 and 1679; grave cross, 18th century; Way of the Cross, steles with reliefs, late 19th or early 20th century
 Kavelocherhof – chapel with relief, Trinity relief, 18th century
 Way of the Cross – steles with reliefs
 Northwest of Klotten – wayside crosses, niche cross, from 1652; two cross fragments
 Above Klotten – Seitskapelle; vineyard chapel, two-part building; Gothic Revival Christ figure
 Below the castle – Way of the Cross, reliefs, 20th century

Since 2002, Saint Maximin's Church has housed a reliquary of Polish queen Richeza.

Other sites
Nearby on the Moselle heights is found the Klotten Wilderness and Leisure Park (Wild- und Freizeitpark Klotten). Also worth seeing is the Dortebachtal Nature Conservation Area (Naturschutzgebiet Dortebachtal).

Further reading 
Alfons Friderichs: Auf den Spuren der Polenköniging Richeza in Klotten, in: Begegnung mit Polen, Düsseldorf 1968, 9/12. 
 Alfons Friderichs, Karl Josef Gilles: Klotten und Burg Coraidelstein. In: Rheinische Kunststätten, Heft 8, 1969, veränderte   
Auflage, Heft 120, 1980.
 Alfons Friderichs: Klotten und seine Geschichte. In: Schriftreihe der Ortchroniken des Trierer Landes, Bd. 29, Briedel 1997.
 Alfons Friderichs: Wappenbuch des Kreises Cochem-Zell, Darmstadt 2001, Ortsgemeinde Klotten 50/1.
 Alfons Friderichs: Persönlichkeiten des Kreises Cochem-Zell, Trier 2004, "von Clotten" 71/76.
 Alfons Friderichs: Urkundenbuch des Kreises Cochem-Zell, Trier 2008, Klotten 237/73.

References

External links 
  

Cochem-Zell